Grein is a municipality in the district Perg in the Austrian state of Upper Austria. It lies on the Danube River.

Population

Sights
One attraction in Grein is Greinburg Castle, built between 1488 and 1493. The castle was purchased by Ernest I, Duke of Saxe-Coburg and Gotha in 1823 and is now owned by a family foundation, headed by Andreas, Prince of Saxe-Coburg and Gotha. The ducal family is living here but the castle is also open for visitors.

Further there is the oldest theatre in all of Austria located in the city.

References

External links
 Website of Greinburg Castle

Cities and towns in Perg District